Morpholine is an organic chemical compound having the chemical formula O(CH2CH2)2NH. This heterocycle features both amine and ether functional groups. Because of the amine, morpholine is a base; its conjugate acid is called morpholinium. For example, treating morpholine with hydrochloric acid makes the salt morpholinium chloride. It is a colorless liquid with a weak, ammonia- or fish-like odor. The naming of morpholine is attributed to Ludwig Knorr, who incorrectly believed it to be part of the structure of morphine.

Production
Morpholine is often produced industrially by the dehydration of diethanolamine with sulfuric acid:

Uses

Industrial applications
Morpholine is a common additive, in parts per million concentrations, for pH adjustment in both fossil fuel and nuclear power plant steam systems. Morpholine is used because its volatility is about the same as water, so once it is added to the water, its concentration becomes distributed rather evenly in both the water and steam phases. Its pH-adjusting qualities then become distributed throughout the steam plant to provide corrosion protection. Morpholine is often used in conjunction with low concentrations of hydrazine or ammonia to provide a comprehensive all-volatile treatment chemistry for corrosion protection for the steam systems of such plants. Morpholine decomposes reasonably slowly in the absence of oxygen at the high temperatures and pressures in these steam systems.

Organic synthesis
Morpholine undergoes most chemical reactions typical for other secondary amines, though the presence of the ether oxygen withdraws electron density from the nitrogen, rendering it less nucleophilic (and less basic) than structurally similar secondary amines such as piperidine. For this reason, it forms a stable chloramine.

It is commonly used to generate enamines.

Morpholine is widely used in organic synthesis. For example, it is a building block in the preparation of the antibiotic linezolid, the anticancer agent gefitinib (Iressa) and the analgesic dextromoramide.

In research and in industry, the low cost and polarity of morpholine lead to its common use as a solvent for chemical reactions.

Agriculture

As a fruit coating 
Morpholine is used as a chemical emulsifier in the process of waxing fruit. Naturally, fruits make waxes to protect against insects and fungal contamination, but this can be lost as the fruit is cleaned. A small amount of new wax is applied to replace it. Morpholine is used as an emulsifier and solubility aid for shellac, which is used as a wax for fruit coating. The European Union has forbidden the use of morpholine in fruit coating.

As a component in fungicides
Morpholine derivatives used as agricultural fungicides in cereals are known as ergosterol biosynthesis inhibitors.

Amorolfine
Fenpropimorph
Tridemorph

See also
 Morpholino

References

External links

 
Ether solvents
Amine solvents
Foul-smelling chemicals
Nitrogen heterocycles
Oxygen heterocycles
Six-membered rings